Mayo is a given name. Notable people with the name include:

, Japanese women's footballer
 Mayo Kawasaki (born 1963), Japanese actor 
 Mayo Hibi (born 1996), Japanese tennis player
, Japanese synchronized swimmer
 Mayo Methot (1904-1951), American actress, third wife of Humphrey Bogart
 Mayo Okamoto (born 1974), Japanese singer-songwriter
 Mayo Smith (1915–1977), American baseball player and manager
 Mayo Suzukaze (born 1960), Japanese actress
 Mayo Thompson (born 1944), American musician and visual artist
 Mayo Yamaura (born 1984), Japanese curler

Feminine given names
Japanese feminine given names